Complutia is a monotypic moth genus of the family Erebidae. Its only species, Complutia transversa, is found in Honduras. Both the genus and the species were first described by Francis Walker in 1869.

References

Calpinae
Monotypic moth genera